In Search of Solid Ground is the second studio album by American rock band Saosin, released on September 8, 2009 through Virgin Records. Recording sessions for the album saw Saosin recording with multiple producers such as Butch Walker, John Feldman, and Lucas from Matt Squire's production team. Five songs off the album were self-produced by the band's guitarist Beau Burchell and bass guitarist Chris Sorenson. The album is also the last release to feature former lead vocalist Cove Reber and guitarist Justin Shekoski.

Background

PacSun hosted a listening party at 5pm in every PacSun store to hear the full album on September 7, 2009.  The song "Why Can't You See" was made available on Last.fm. The full album was released in Japan on September 1, 2009 with the bonus track "You Never Noticed Me." The album was put on  MySpace on September 4. The B-side "Move Slow" is included on the NCIS: Soundtrack – Vol. 2, which was released on November 3, 2009.

Reception of the album has been divided amongst fans due to the change in style.
The album was removed from iTunes for unknown reasons, but it was made available again sometime in early 2012.

Artwork

The original album artwork was revealed on July 13, 2009 by Alternative Press. The cover was immediately met with a negative reaction from fans causing Saosin to reevaluate their decision two days before the album was pressed. The band attempted to create something "high concept" with the original art, but the negative reaction helped the band realize that they "always keep things simple and strong and let the music speak for itself."

Music

Three of the songs on the album are re-recordings of tracks from The Grey EP (2008). "I Keep My Secrets Safe" is a re-recording of "Keep Secrets". "Why Can't You See?" keeps the title of the song from the EP, and "The Worst of Me" is "Love Maker", the new name taken from a line in the chorus of the song.

The two songs "On My Own" and "Is This Real" were released as singles on iTunes August 4, 2009. The song "Changing" was released as a single August 11. The song "The Worst of Me" was released as a free song included in a Hurley Warped Tour pack.

Track listing
All songs written by Beau Burchell, Cove Reber and Chris Sorenson, except for where noted.

Personnel

Saosin
Cove Reber – lead vocals, keyboards, piano
Beau Burchell – rhythm guitar, vocals
Justin Shekoski – lead guitar, vocals
Chris Sorenson – bass, vocals
Alex Rodriguez – drums, percussion

Additional musicians
 John Feldmann – percussion, strings
 Butch Walker – composer, percussion
 Jeremy S.H. Griffith – composer, vocals
 Scott Sorenson – vocals
 D. Basset – composer
 Lucas Banker – composer
 Chris Sorenson – composer
 M. Squire – composer

Production
 Beau Burchell – engineer, mixing
 Chris Sorenson – art direction, concept, mixing, producer
 Jarrod Alexander – drum technician
 Matt "Hippie" Appleton – engineer
 Lucas Banker – producer
 John Feldmann – engineer, producer
 Ken Floyd – guitar technician
 Logan Mader – engineer, producer
 Erik Ron – engineer
 Sean Stiegmeier – photography
 Butch Walker – producer
 Howie Weinberg – mastering
 Ryan Williams – engineer

Charts

References

Saosin albums
2009 albums
Virgin Records albums
Albums produced by Butch Walker
Albums produced by John Feldmann